Pruni may refer to several villages in Romania:

 Pruni, a village in Bobâlna Commune, Cluj County
 Pruni, a village in town of Măgurele, Ilfov County